Sasha Carter (born July 20, 1974 in Ashern, Manitoba) also known as Sasha Bergner, is a Canadian curler from Kelowna, British Columbia.

Career

Juniors
Carter has been a long time team mate of Scott. She would represent Manitoba at the 1995 Canadian Junior Curling Championships, where the team would finish round robin with a 7-4 record. They would play the defending champions, Jennifer Jones in the semi-final and would win, moving on to face Ontario's Kirsten Harmark (Wall) in the final.  The team would end up defeating Ontario and winning the championship, going on to win the 1995 World Junior Curling Championships.

2005–2009
Both Scott and Carter moved to British Columbia and remained team mates there. Together along with Michelle Allen and Renee Simons, the team would win the 2005 British Columbia Scott Tournament of Hearts. Carter and Scott would play in their first National Women's Championship. They would find success at the 2005 Scott Tournament of Hearts, when they finished round robin with a second place 8-3 record. They would lose to Manitoba's Jennifer Jones in the 1-2 game, before losing the semi-final to Ontario's Jenn Hanna.

The team would participate at the 2005 Canadian Olympic Curling Trials, where they would finish first place in round robin with a 7-2 record. They would face Shannon Kleibrink in the final, and leading 7-5 after nine ends, would give up three in the tenth, losing the olympic bid to Kleibrink.

In 2006 Jeanna Schraeder would return to the team, and they would win the 2006 British Columbia Scott Tournament of Hearts. The team would again find success at the 2006 Scott Tournament of Hearts, where they finished round robin in first place with a 9-2 record. The team would defeat Nova Scotia's Colleen Jones in the 1-2 and would get a bye to the final. The team would meet the defending champions, Jennifer Jones, in the final where they would win 8-5 and the national championship. The team would just make the playoffs at the 2006 Ford World Women's Curling Championship. They would defeat Germany's Andrea Schöpp in the 3-4 game, before losing the semi-final to the U.S and Debbie McCormick.

As defending champions the team would return to the 2007 Scotties Tournament of Hearts, where for a second year in a row, would finish first place in round robin with a 10-1 record. They would lose the 1-2 game to Saskatchewan's Jan Betker, but would go on to defeat Manitoba's Jennifer Jones in the semi-final. They would face Betker again in the final, and this time defeated the team winning their second national championship.  At the 2007 World Women's Curling Championship, the team would finish first place in round robin with a 10-1 record. They would defeat Denmark's Angelina Jensen in the 1-2 game, receiving a bye to the final. They would end up meeting Jensen once again in the final, and would successfully defeat the Denmark team, winning their first world championship.

Returning to the 2008 Scotties Tournament of Hearts as defending champions, the team would not find success this time around. They would fail to qualify for the playoffs, finish round robin with a disappointing 5-6 record.

After a disappointing 2008 season, the team made the decision to part ways with lead Renee Simons, replacing her with Jacquie Armstrong. The newly revamped team would still find difficulties, failing to qualify for the 2009 provincials. They would get the opportunity to compete in the 2009 Canadian Olympic Curling Trials, however would finish round robin last place, with a 1-6 record.

2010–2013
Carter, along with the rest of the Scott team would qualify for and win the 2010 British Columbia Scotties Tournament of Hearts. When they returned to the 2010 Scotties Tournament of Hearts, the team would again make the playoffs, having finished round robin third, with a 7-4 record. They would face Ontario's Krista McCarville in the 3-4 game and would lose 4-6.

For a second year in a row the team would qualify for and win the 2011 British Columbia Scotties Tournament of Hearts. This time Carter would attend the 2011 Scotties Tournament of Hearts six months pregnant. After round robin play concluded, the team would be tied for fourth place with a 7-4 record. They would enter a tiebreaker with Nova Scotia's Heather Smith-Dacey. In spite of stealing two points in the tenth end, the team would fall short losing the tiebreaker 8-9.

At the end of the 2010-2011 season Jeanna Schraeder would leave the team due to pregnancy. The team added Daliene Sivertson at third to replace Schraeder, however halfway through the season, Carter would move from throwing second stones to third stones, Sivertson moving to second stones, but still holding the broom. The move meant success and the team would win the 2012 British Columbia Scotties Tournament of Hearts, barely defeating Marla Mallett in the final.  At the 2012 Scotties Tournament of Hearts, the team would finish round robin in second place with an 8-3 record. They would face Manitoba's Jennifer Jones in the 1-2 game, and would defeat the team from Manitoba 7-5 receiving a bye to the final. The team would meet Alberta's Heather Nedohin in the final, and in a close game would lose 6-7.  Carter was again pregnant at the 2012 event.

At the end of the 2011-2012 season both Armstrong and Sivertson would leave the team. Scott and Carter would welcome back Jeanna Schraeder, and also added Sarah Wazney to the team. The team won another provincial title and would win a bronze medal at the 2013 Scotties Tournament of Hearts.

2020–present
On March 3, 2020, it was announced she and former teammates Jeanna Schraeder and Renee Simons would be skipped by five-time Scotties Champion Mary-Anne Arsenault for the 2020–21 season. The team played in one event during the abbreviated season, finishing runner-up at the Sunset Ranch Kelowna Double Cash to Team Corryn Brown. Due to the COVID-19 pandemic in British Columbia, the 2021 provincial championship was cancelled. As the reigning provincial champions, Team Brown was invited to represent British Columbia at the 2021 Scotties Tournament of Hearts, which they accepted, ending the season for Team Arsenault.

The next season, the team again reached the final of the Sunset Ranch Kelowna Double Cash, losing to the Kaila Buchy junior rink. They were able to compete in their provincial championship at the 2022 British Columbia Scotties Tournament of Hearts in Kamloops from January 5 to 9. After losing to Team Kayla MacMillan in both the A Final and 1 vs. 2 page playoff game, Team Arsenault defeated MacMillan 8–6 in the final to win the provincial championship. At the 2022 Scotties Tournament of Hearts, the team finished with a 3–5 round robin record, defeating Quebec, the Northwest Territories and the Yukon in their three victories.

Personal life
Outside of curling, Carter works as Development Officer, Planned Giving, for the Okanagan College Foundation. She is a graduate of the University of Manitoba. She is married to Greg Carter and has two children.

References

External links
 

Curlers from British Columbia
Curlers from Manitoba
1974 births
Living people
World curling champions
Canadian women curlers
Canadian women's curling champions
Continental Cup of Curling participants
Canada Cup (curling) participants